is the tenth single by Bump of Chicken, released on July 21, 2005. The title track is from the album Orbital Period.

Track listing
All tracks written by Fujiwara Motoo.

 (Hidden track)

Personnel
Fujiwara Motoo — Guitar, vocals
Masukawa Hiroaki — Guitar
Naoi Yoshifumi — Bass
Masu Hideo — Drums

Chart performance

References

External links
Planetarium on the official Bump of Chicken website.

2005 singles
Bump of Chicken songs
2005 songs